Tindra Holm (born 26 May 2001) is a Swedish ice hockey goaltender, currently playing with the LIU Sharks women's ice hockey program in the New England Women's Hockey Alliance (NEWHA) conference of the NCAA Division I.

Playing career 
Growing up in Kåge, just outside Skellefteå, Holm mostly played on boys' teams, but spent some time with the Damettan sides of Clemensnäs HC and IF Björklöven between 2013 and 2016. In 2016, she was named to Västerbotten's team for TV-pucken, the fifth girl in history to participate in the tournament.

From 2016 to 2018, she played for the Skellefteå AIK U16 boys' teams. She was loaned to Luleå HF/MSSK in the Swedish Women's Hockey League (SDHL), the top flight of Swedish women's hockey, for a game in December 2016. Luleå won 11–0, with Holm picking up a shutout on her SDHL debut as a 15-year-old.

In 2018, Holm signed with Modo Hockey, serving as the club's SDHL backup goaltender. She picked up another shutout on her Modo debut, her second SDHL shutout in as many games, as the club defeated Göteborg HC 4–0.

She left Modo after two seasons, returning to Luleå HF for the 2020–21 season.

Holm joined the LIU Sharks ice hockey program of Long Island University as an incoming freshman for the 2021–22 NCAA Division I women's ice hockey season. She was named NEWHA Rookie of the Week for the week of 5 October 2021 and earned NEWHA Goaltender of the Week honors for the week of 23 November after making 60 saves on 63 shots for a .950 (95%) save percentage across back-to-back victories over Saint Anselm.

International career 
Holm represented Sweden at the 2019 IIHF World Women's U18 Championship.

Personal life 
Holm's father, Krister Holm, has been the goaltending coach for Skellefteå AIK in the Swedish Hockey League (SHL) since 2006.

References

External links

2001 births
Living people
People from Skellefteå Municipality
Swedish women's ice hockey goaltenders
LIU Sharks women's ice hockey players
Modo Hockey Dam players
Luleå HF/MSSK players
Skellefteå AIK players
IF Björklöven players
Swedish expatriate ice hockey players in the United States
Sportspeople from Västerbotten County